Coprophobia is fear of or aversion to feces or defecation.

In humans, the attitude to feces and defecation has become a cultural taboo.

In the animal world, many herbivorous grazing animals including cows, sheep, horses, and reindeer avoid feces when feeding.  Primates also prefer to forage away from feces-contaminated areas.  The aversion is believed to be a strategy to avoid infection.

References

Phobias
Excretion
Ethology